Edwin C. "Babe" Horrell (September 29, 1902 – June 13, 1992) was an American football player and coach.  He played college football at the University of California, Berkeley, where he was an All-American in 1924 at center.  Horrell served as the head football coach at the University of California, Los Angeles from 1939 to 1944, compiling a record of 24–31–6.  In 1942, he led the UCLA Bruins to the Pacific Coast Conference title and an appearance in the Rose Bowl.  Horrell was inducted into the College Football Hall of Fame as a player in 1969.

Playing career
Horrell played as center for the California Golden Bears from 1922 to 1924.  During those three seasons,  the team went 26–0–3 under head coach Andy Smith.

Coaching career
From 1926 to 1938, Horrell was an assistant coach for the UCLA Bruins.  He then served as the head coach from 1939 to 1944, compiling a 24–31–6 record.  His 1942 UCLA Bruins team lost to Georgia in the 1943 Rose Bowl. He was the first coach to lead a UCLA team to defeat the rival USC Trojans in what became the UCLA–USC rivalry.

Head coaching record

References

External links
 

1902 births
1992 deaths
American football centers
California Golden Bears football players
UCLA Bruins football coaches
All-American college football players
College Football Hall of Fame inductees
People from Jackson, Missouri
Sportspeople from Pasadena, California
Coaches of American football from California
Players of American football from Pasadena, California